SAS Australia: Who Dares Wins, also known as SAS Australia, is a reality quasi-military training television programme based on the original British SAS: Who Dares Wins that is broadcast on Seven Network since 19 October 2020. Upon release of the first season, the show's name was changed to simply SAS Australia. The series features Ant Middleton as the chief instructor.

Cast

Celebrity edition
</onlyinclude>

Season 1 (2020)
Production began in March 2020 on location in Queenstown, New Zealand, however production was halted due to the COVID-19 pandemic. They recommenced filming on a property on the outskirts of Berridale in the Snowy Mountains of New South Wales in Australia at GPS Coordinates . Production crew stayed locally in Jindabyne while filming.

Olympian Jana Pittman was reported to be a contestant in the March 2020 production, but with her pregnancy in the intervening months, was replaced by former The Biggest Loser Australia trainer Shannan Ponton. Pittman subsequently appeared as a contestant in Season 2, six months after giving birth.

Full list of confirmed celebrities:

Ratings

Season 2 (2021)
In October 2020, the series was renewed for a second season. The second season began airing on 13 September 2021.

The season was filmed in the Capertree Valley in NSW with the camp being constructed in the Glen Davies Ruins. The Ruins are the remains of the Oil Shale Ruins which began operation in 1938 and ceased operation in 1952. The Glen Davis Ruins are on private property, but is available to visitors on a Saturday at 2pm

Full list of confirmed celebrities:

Ratings

Season 3 (2022)

The third season began airing on 21 February 2022.

Full list of celebrities were confirmed in October 2021:

Ratings

Season 4 (2023)

Full list of "celebrities" were confirmed in March 2023:

Civilian edition

Season 1 (2021)

In March 2021, Seven commissioned a mini-series featuring civilian contestants in addition to the second main season. Titled SAS: Hell Week the mini-season was filmed back to back with the second celebrity season in the Blue Mountains.

Ratings

Civilian winners

References

External links

2020 Australian television series debuts
2020s Australian reality television series
English-language television shows
Seven Network original programming
Australian television series based on British television series
Australian military television series
Television series by Screentime
Television productions suspended due to the COVID-19 pandemic
Television shows set in New South Wales